Druzhba is an urban-type settlement in Ternopil Raion (district) of Ternopil Oblast (province) in western Ukraine. It belongs to Mykulyntsi settlement hromada, one of the hromadas of Ukraine. Its population is 1,647 as of the 2001 Ukrainian Census. Current population:  The town was founded in 1896 as the village of Zelena. In 1963, the village was renamed to its current name, and it was upgraded to that of an urban-type settlement in 1986.

Until 18 July 2020, Druzhba belonged to Terebovlia Raion. The raion was abolished in July 2020 as part of the administrative reform of Ukraine, which reduced the number of raions of Ternopil Oblast to three. The area of Terebovlia Raion was merged into Ternopil Raion.

See also
 Mykulyntsi, the other urban-type settlement in Terebovlia Raion of Ternopil Oblast

References

Urban-type settlements in Ternopil Raion
Populated places established in 1896